Gitanjana Gunawardena is a Sri Lankan politician and former member of Parliament of Sri Lanka and former minister. He is a Chartered Engineer by profession.

Personal life
Born 24 February 1952 as son of Philip Gunawardena and Kusuma Amarasinha, and brother of Indika (Ex-Cabinet Minister), Prasanna (Ex-Mayor of Colombo), Lakmali (State Award Winner of literature), & Dinesh (Cabinet Minister & Leader of the House – Parliament).

See also 
List of political families in Sri Lanka

References

 

Living people
Sri Lankan Buddhists
Mahajana Eksath Peramuna politicians
United People's Freedom Alliance politicians
1952 births
Members of the 9th Parliament of Sri Lanka
Members of the 13th Parliament of Sri Lanka
Members of the 14th Parliament of Sri Lanka
Deputy speakers and chairmen of committees of the Parliament of Sri Lanka